Yaakov ben Yaakov Moshe Lorberbaum of Lissa (1760-1832) (known in English as Jacob ben Jacob Moses of Lissa, Jacob Lorberbaum or Jacob Lisser, Hebrew: יעקב בן יעקב משה מליסא) was a rabbi and posek. He is most commonly known as the "Ba'al HaChavas Da'as" or "Ba'al HaNesivos" for his most well-known works, or as the "Lissa Rav" for the city in which he was Chief Rabbi.

Biography
Lorberbaum was the great-grandson of the Chacham Tzvi, Rabbi Zvi Ashkenazi. According to one tradition, his father, Rabbi Yaakov Moshe, died before he was born, and his relative, Rabbi Yosef Teomim, the rabbi of Bursztyn, brought him up. This accounts for the common name that both father and son share. Another tradition states that before he was born, his father fell ill, and dreamed that he would recover in the merit of the son that would be born to him. In the merit of his future son, the father took his name-to-be. Yet another legend told is that at his naming ceremony his father was preoccupied with his study and thought they asked for his own name. He studied under Rabbi Meshulam Igra.

He was head of the Beis Din in Kalush, Ukraine. In 1809, he agreed to become the Rav in Lissa (today known as Leszno, Poland), where he enlarged his Yeshiva's enrollment. Hundreds of scholars came to study there in the years of his leadership. Among his students were Rabbi Elijah Gutmacher, Rabbi Zvi Hirsch Kalischer, and Rabbi Shraga Feivel Danziger.

Along with Rabbi Akiva Eiger and Eiger's son-in-law, the Chasam Sofer, Lorberbaum vehemently fought against the maskilim, the reformers of the Jewish Enlightenment. In 1822, he left Lissa and returned to Kalish, where he wrote many of his works. He lived there for ten years.

He was widely respected as a posek, and is one of three authorities on whom Rabbi Shlomo Ganzfried based his rulings in the Kitzur Shulchan Aruch, the well known precis of Jewish law.  Similarly, the Chochmat Adam, by Rabbi Avraham Danzig, was written in consultation with Lorberbaum (as well as Rabbi Chaim Volozhin).

His status was such that it is reported that Eiger once fainted when he was honored with an Aliyah in the lieu of Rav Yaakov. (See Shimusha Shel Torah, Rabbi Meir Tzvi Bergman).

Lorberbaum died in Stryj (then in Galicia) on 25 May 1832.

Works
Reb Yaakov wrote many works of Torah on Talmud and on Halacha (Jewish law).
 
Works on Talmud include:
 Toras Gittin, commentary on Shulchan Aruch, Even HaEzer, 119-155, and chiddushim on the Talmudic treatise Gittin (Frankfort-on-the-Oder, 1813; Warsaw, 1815)
 Beis Yaakov, commentary on Shulchan Aruch, Even HaEzer, 66-118, and on the Talmudic tractate Ketubot (Grubeschow, 1823)
 Emes L'Yaakov (on aggadah)
 He also published his late father's works on the Talmud, including his famous novellae to Tractate Keritot
Works of Halacha include:
 Chavas Daas, commentary on Shulchan Aruch, Yoreh Deah, 69-201; the earlier sections of Yoreh Deah (1-68) are very briefly dealt with in the form of an introduction to the work (Lemberg, 1799; Dyhernfurth, 1810, and often since in editions of the Yoreh Deah, as the Vilna 1894 ed.). In it the works of earlier commentators are discussed and somewhat pilpulistically developed.
 Mekor chayim, commentary on Shulchan Aruch, Orach Chayim, 429 and following, with notes on the commentaries Turei Zahav and Magen Avraham; the second part contains chiddushim on Keritot (Zolkiev, 1807; Frankfort-on-the-Oder, 1813; Warsaw, 1825; Dyhernfurth, 1827)
 Nesivos HaMishpat on Shulchan Aruch, Choshen Mishpat, in two parts (Dyhernfurth, Lemberg; Zolkiev, 1809, 1816; Sudilkov, 1830; and often since in Lemberg editions of Shulchan Aruch, Choshen Mishpaṭ). It is said that Nesivos HaMishpat was made famous by the strong attacks in it against the Ketzos HaChoshen of Rabbi Aryeh Leib Heller.
 Kehillas Yaakov, a collection of discussions and notes on several legal points in the Even HaEzer and Orach Chayim
 Derech Chaim on Orach Chayim (Zolkiev, 1828; Altona, 1831). This compendium is very popular and was frequently reprinted in the larger Hebrew prayer-books. These dinim are taken either from later exponents of the Law as contained in the works Turei Zahav, Magen Abraham, Pri Megadim, etc., or from his own decisions. The sources from which he borrowed are usually indicated.
Other works by Rabbi Lorberbaum include:
Imrei Yosher, commentary on the Five Megillot (ib. 1815 and 1819).  The commentary on each Megillah is under a different name.
 Tzror HaMor, commentary on Song of Songs
 Palgei Mayim, commentary on Lamentations
 Talumos Chochmah, commentary on Ecclesiastes (Lemberg, 1804; Dyhernfurth, 1819)
 Megillas S'tarim, commentary on the Book of Esther
 Imrei Yosher, commentary on Ruth
Masei Nissim, a commentary on the Pesach Haggadah, with the text and a short compendium of the Passover ritual (Kitzur Dinim; Zolkiev, 1807, 1835; Minsk, 1816; Dyhernfurth, 1817, and later)
Nachalas Yaakov (Breslau, 1849), published by his cousin Naphtali Z. Chachamowicz after his death, comprising sermons on the Torah Portion, halachic decisions, responsa, and his last will. In this famous ethical will he asked that his sons devote time every day to learn at least one page of Gemara.

References 

 Its bibliography:
Isaac Benjacob, Otzar ha-Sefarim
Abraham Dob Berusch Flahm, Ebel Yachid, Warsaw, 1833;
Fuenn, Keneset Yisrael, i. 554;
Julius Fürst, Bibl. Jud. ii. 21 et seq.;
Moritz Steinschneider, Cat. Bodl. col. 1229;
Aaron Walden, Shem ha-Gedolim he-Ḥadash;
Joseph Zedner, Cat. Hebr. Books Brit. Mus. p. 304.

External links
Jacob Ben Jacob Moses of Lissa, jewishencyclopedia.com

1760 births
1832 deaths
19th-century Polish rabbis
People from Leszno
18th-century rabbis from the Russian Empire
Authors of books on Jewish law